The Bishop's Wife (also known as Cary and the Bishop's Wife) is a 1947 American romantic comedy film directed by Henry Koster and starring Cary Grant, Loretta Young, and David Niven. The plot is about an angel who helps a bishop with his problems. The film was adapted by Leonardo Bercovici and Robert E. Sherwood from the 1928 novel of the same name by Robert Nathan.

It was remade in 1996 as The Preacher's Wife starring Denzel Washington, Whitney Houston, and Courtney B. Vance.

Plot
Bishop Henry Brougham (David Niven), troubled with funding the building of a new cathedral, prays for divine guidance. His plea is seemingly answered by a suave angel named Dudley (Cary Grant), who reveals his identity only to the clergyman.

However, Dudley's mission is not to help construct a cathedral, but to spiritually guide Henry and the people around him. Henry has become obsessed with raising funds, to the detriment of his family life. His relationships with wife Julia (Loretta Young) and their young daughter Debby (Karolyn Grimes) are strained by his focus on the cathedral.

Everyone, except for Henry, is charmed by Dudley, even the non-religious Professor Wutheridge (Monty Woolley). When Dudley spends time cheering up Julia, though, an unexpected development occurs: he finds himself strongly attracted to her. Sensing this, Henry becomes jealous and anxious for his now unwelcome guest to finish and depart. He reveals Dudley's true identity to Professor Wutheridge, who urges him to stand up and fight for the woman he loves.

Dudley persuades a wealthy parishioner, the widowed Agnes Hamilton (Gladys Cooper), to contribute her much needed funds, but not to build the cathedral as Henry had hoped. Instead, he coaxes Mrs. Hamilton to donate her money to feed and clothe the needy—much to Henry's chagrin. 

On several occasions throughout the film, Dudley reveals himself to viewers as an angel. He helps Julia and Sylvester (a taxi driver) ice skate like pros, redecorates the Broughams' Christmas tree in a few seconds, saves an old church by restoring interest in the boys' choir, dictates to a typewriter to magically produce Henry's new sermon—without Henry's knowledge—among other small things.

As the climax to the movie approaches, Dudley hints to Julia his willingness to stay with her and not move on to his next assignment. Although Julia doesn't fully understand what he's talking about, she senses what he means, and tells him it is time for him to leave. Dudley tells the bishop it is rare for an angel to envy a mortal. When Henry wants to know why his cathedral plans were derailed, Dudley reminds the bishop he prayed for guidance, not a building.

With his mission completed and knowing that Julia loves her husband, Dudley leaves, promising never to return. All memory of him is erased, and later that Christmas Eve at midnight, Henry delivers the sermon he believes he has written. Dudley observes from the street, satisfied that his work is done.

Cast

Niven was originally cast as the angel, Dana Andrews as the bishop, and Teresa Wright as his wife. However, Wright had to bow out due to pregnancy. According to Robert Osborne, Andrews was lent to RKO in order to obtain Loretta Young. Koster then brought in Cary Grant, but he wanted to play the angel, so the role of the bishop was given to Niven.

Production

Production faced a few difficulties. Producer Samuel Goldwyn replaced director William A. Seiter with Henry Koster to create a completely new film. In early previews, audiences disliked the film, so Billy Wilder and Charles Brackett made uncredited rewrites. Even so, and even though the premiere of The Bishop's Wife was accompanied by critical success, the film did not initially perform well at the box office. Market research showed that moviegoers avoided the film because they thought it was religious. As a result, Goldwyn decided to retitle it Cary and the Bishop's Wife for certain US markets, while adding a black text box with the question "Have you heard about CARY AND THE BISHOP'S WIFE?" on posters in markets where the film kept the original title. By adding Grant's first name to the title, the film's business increased by as much as 25 percent.

Location filming was in Minneapolis, Minnesota. In the scene in which Dudley conducts the boys' choir, the Charles Gounod composition 'Noël: Montez à Dieu' ('O Sing to God') was performed by the Robert Mitchell Boys Choir. The song "Lost April" featured in the film had lyrics written for it by Nat King Cole, who also recorded it.

Reception
On the review aggregator website Rotten Tomatoes, The Bishop's Wife holds an approval rating of  based on  reviews. The website's critical consensus reads, "The Bishop's Wife succeeds thanks to the strength of winning performances from a stellar cast, which includes Cary Grant and Loretta Young."

Awards and nominations

The film is recognized by American Film Institute in these lists:
 2002: AFI's 100 Years...100 Passions – Nominated
 2006: AFI's 100 Years...100 Cheers – Nominated

Adaptations to other media
The Bishop's Wife was dramatized as a half-hour radio play on the March 1, 1948, broadcast of The Screen Guild Theater with Cary Grant, Loretta Young and David Niven in their original film roles. It was also presented on Lux Radio Theater three times as an hour-long broadcast: first on December 19, 1949, with Tyrone Power and David Niven, second on May 11, 1953, with Cary Grant and Phyllis Thaxter and third on March 1, 1955, again with Grant and Thaxter.

The soundtrack has been released on compact disc.

The 1996 film The Preacher's Wife was a remake based on The Bishop's Wife.

See also
 List of films about angels
 List of Christmas films

References

External links

 
 
 
 

Streaming audio
 The Bishop's Wife on Screen Guild Theater: March 1, 1948
 The Bishop's Wife on Lux Radio Theater: May 11, 1953

1947 films
1947 romantic comedy films
1940s American films
1940s Christmas comedy films
1940s English-language films
1940s fantasy comedy films
1940s romantic fantasy films
American black-and-white films
American Christmas comedy films
American fantasy comedy films
American romantic comedy films
American romantic fantasy films
Films about angels
Films about Christianity
Films based on works by Robert Nathan
Films directed by Henry Koster
Films scored by Hugo Friedhofer
Films shot in Minnesota
Films that won the Best Sound Mixing Academy Award
Films with screenplays by Billy Wilder
Films with screenplays by Charles Brackett
RKO Pictures films
Samuel Goldwyn Productions films